was the professional wrestling tag team of Kenny Omega and Kota Ibushi. The team was formed in January 2009 in the Japanese DDT Pro-Wrestling promotion, where, over the next five years, they won the KO-D Tag Team Championship on two occasions. The team also made appearances for New Japan Pro-Wrestling (NJPW), where they won the IWGP Junior Heavyweight Tag Team Championship once. The team disbanded when Omega left DDT in October 2014. Omega and Ibushi reunited at The New Beginning in Sapporo in January 2018.

History

In July 2008, Canadian wrestler Kenny Omega started his first Japanese tour with the DDT Pro-Wrestling promotion, where he quickly became friends with Kota Ibushi, with the two forming a tag team named "Golden☆Lovers" in January 2009. On January 24, Ibushi and Omega defeated Harashima and Toru Owashi to win the KO-D Tag Team Championship for the first time. After one successful defense, they lost the title to Francesco Togo and Piza Michinoku on May 10. Over the following years, Omega and Ibushi established themselves as one of the top tag teams on the Japanese independent circuit.

On January 31, 2010, the Golden☆Lovers made their debut for New Japan Pro-Wrestling (NJPW), defeating Gedo and Jado by referee stoppage, when Jado was legitimately injured. Afterwards, the Golden☆Lovers engaged in a rivalry with Apollo 55, a tag team made up of Prince Devitt and Ryusuke Taguchi. On October 11 at NJPW's Destruction '10 event, the Golden☆Lovers defeated Apollo 55 to win the IWGP Junior Heavyweight Tag Team Championship, in a match that was later named the 2010 Match of the Year by Tokyo Sports, becoming the first junior heavyweight tag team match in history to win the award. After making successful title defenses against Apollo 55 and the team of Gedo and Jado, with both matches taking place back in DDT, Ibushi and Omega lost the title back to Apollo 55 on January 23, 2011, during NJPW's Fantastica Mania 2011 weekend. The Golden☆Lovers received a rematch for the title on August 14, but were again defeated by Apollo 55.

Meanwhile, in DDT, Ibushi and Omega came together with Gota Ihashi to form the Golden☆Rendezvous～ stable, with the three holding the KO-D 6-Man Tag Team Championship from May 26 to June 23, 2013. On January 26, 2014, the Golden☆Lovers won the KO-D Tag Team Championship for the second time by defeating reigning champions Yanke Nichōkenjū (Isami Kodaka and Yuko Miyamoto) and the team of Konosuke Takeshita and Tetsuya Endo in a three-way match. On April 12, Ibushi and Omega became double champions, when the two, along with the newest member of the Golden☆Rendezvous～ stable, Daisuke Sasaki, defeated Team Drift (Keisuke Ishii, Shigehiro Irie and Soma Takao) for the KO-D 6-Man Tag Team Championship. The trio's reign lasted until May 4, when they were defeated by Shuten-dōji (Kudo, Masa Takanashi and Yukio Sakaguchi) in their second defense. Ibushi and Omega continued holding the KO-D Tag Team Championship until September 28, 2014, when they were defeated by Konosuke Takeshita and Tetsuya Endo.

On October 3, 2014, Omega announced he was leaving DDT and signing with NJPW, where Ibushi was already a semi-regular. However, with Ibushi having recently moved to NJPW's heavyweight division, Omega stated that the Golden☆Lovers were done as a tag team due to him wanting to remain in the junior heavyweight division. The Golden☆Lovers wrestled their final match together on October 26, 2014, when they defeated Danshoku Dino and Konosuke Takeshita in Omega's DDT farewell match.

On January 28, 2018, the Golden☆Lovers were apparently reformed after Omega was seemingly kicked out of Bullet Club and attacked by fellow member Cody. Ibushi made the save for Omega as Bullet Club fled the scene. At first, Omega refused to shake Ibushi's hand, but moments after, both Omega and Ibushi emotionally embraced as confetti fell to the ring. At Honor Rising: Japan Night 2 on February 24, the Golden☆Lovers won their return match as a team against Cody and Marty Scurll. After the match, Omega and Ibushi were confronted by The Young Bucks and challenged to a match at Strong Style Evolved on March 25, which the Golden☆Lovers won.

At Dominion 6.9 in Osaka-jo Hall, Omega defeated Kazuchika Okada to win the IWGP Heavyweight Championship. After the match, Omega reunited with The Young Bucks, forming the Golden☆Elite along with Ibushi.

On the finals of the World Tag League, Ibushi defeated Hirooki Goto to win the NEVER Openweight Championship.

At Wrestle Kingdom, Ibushi lost the NEVER Openweight Championship to Will Ospreay and Omega lost the IWGP Heavyweight Championship to Hiroshi Tanahashi. At the end of January, Omega left NJPW to join All Elite Wrestling in the United States meanwhile Ibushi stayed in NJPW full-time, disbanding for the second time.

Championships and accomplishments

DDT Pro-Wrestling
KO-D 6-Man Tag Team Championship (2 times) – with Gota Ihashi (1) and Daisuke Sasaki (1)
KO-D Tag Team Championship (2 times)
KO-D Openweight Championship (2 times) – Omega (1), Ibushi (1)
Japan Indie Awards
Best Bout Award (2012) Ibushi vs. Omega on August 18
Best Bout Award (2014) vs. Konosuke Takeshita and Tetsuya Endo on October 28
New Japan Pro-Wrestling
IWGP Heavyweight Championship (1 time) – Omega
IWGP Junior Heavyweight Tag Team Championship (1 time)
NEVER Openweight Championship (1 time) – Ibushi
Nikkan Sports
Best Tag Team Award (2010)
SoCal Uncensored
Southern California Match of the Year (2018) vs. The Young Bucks on March 25
Tokyo Sports
Best Bout Award (2010) vs. Apollo 55 on October 11
Weekly Pro Wrestling
Best Bout Award (2010)  vs. Prince Devitt and Ryusuke Taguchi (NJPW, October 11)
Best Tag Team Award (2010)

References

Japanese promotions teams and stables
New Japan Pro-Wrestling teams and stables